Simone Opitz (born 3 July 1963 in Sonneberg, Thuringia) is an East German-German cross-country skier who competed from 1985 to 1993. Competing in two Winter Olympics, she earned best finish of fifth twice at the 1988 Winter Olympics in Calgary (20 km, 4 × 5 km relay).

Opitz's best finish at the FIS Nordic World Ski Championships was fifth in the 10 km event at Val di Fiemme in 1991. Her only World Cup victory was in a 20 km event in Czechoslovakia in 1986.

Cross-country skiing results
All results are sourced from the International Ski Federation (FIS).

Olympic Games

World Championships

World Cup

Season standings

Individual podiums

1 victory 
3 podiums

Team podiums

 1 podium

References

External links

Women's 4 x 5 km cross-country relay Olympic results: 1976-2002 

1963 births
Living people
German female cross-country skiers
Cross-country skiers at the 1988 Winter Olympics
Cross-country skiers at the 1992 Winter Olympics
Olympic cross-country skiers of Germany
People from Sonneberg
Sportspeople from Thuringia